John Michael Baber (born 10 October 1947) was an English footballer. He played professionally for Charlton Athletic and Southend United between 1965 and 1971, making a total of 71 Football League appearances.

References

External links
Southend United career details 

English footballers
Footballers from Lambeth
1947 births
Living people
Margate F.C. players
Charlton Athletic F.C. players
Southend United F.C. players
Association football midfielders